The year 2017 was the 4th year in the history of the Kunlun Fight, a kickboxing promotion based in China. 2017 started with Kunlun Fight 56.

The events were broadcasts through television agreements in mainland China with Jiangsu TV and around the world with various other channels. The events were also streamed live on the Kunlun Fight app and multiple other services. Traditionally, most Kunlun Fight events have both tournament fights and superfights (single fights).

Champions

Events lists

List of Kunlun Fight events

List of Road to Kunlun events

Kunlun Fight 56 

 Kunlun Fight 56 was a kickboxing event held by Kunlun Fight on January 1, 2017 at the Mangrove Tree International Conference Center in Sanya, Hainan, China.

Background

2016 KLF 70 kg World Max Championship Tournament bracket

Results

Kunlun Fight MMA 8 

Kunlun Fight MMA 8 was a mixed martial arts event held by Kunlun Fight on January 2, 2017 at the Mangrove Tree International Conference Center in Sanya, Hainan, China.

Results

Kunlun Fight MMA 9 

Kunlun Fight MMA 9 will be a mixed martial arts event held by Kunlun Fight on February 25, 2017 at the Mangrove Tree International Conference Center in Sanya, Hainan, China.

Results

Kunlun Fight 57 

 Kunlun Fight 57 was a kickboxing event held by Kunlun Fight on February 26, 2017 at the Mangrove Tree International Conference Center in Sanya, Hainan, China.

Background
This event featured two 4-Man 70-kilogram qualifying Tournaments to earn a spot in 2017 KLF 70 kg World Championship Tournament.

2017 KLF 70 kg World championship Qualifying bracket 1

2017 KLF 70 kg World championship Qualifying bracket 2

Results

Kunlun Fight 58 / Magnum FC 1 

Kunlun Fight 58 / Magnum FC 1 was a kickboxing event held by Kunlun Fight and Magnum Fighting Championship on March 11, 2017 at the Atlantico Live in Rome, Italy.

Background
This event featured two 4-Man qualifying Tournaments to earn a spot in 2017 KLF World Championship Tournament.

2017 KLF 70 kg World championship Qualifying bracket 3

2017 KLF 61 kg Muay Thai Intercontinental Championship Qualifying bracket 1

Results

Kunlun Fight 59

 Kunlun Fight 59 was a kickboxing event held by Kunlun Fight on March 25, 2017 at the Mangrove Tree International Conference Center in Sanya, Hainan, China.

Result

Kunlun Fight MMA 10

Kunlun Fight MMA 10 was a mixed martial arts event held by Kunlun Fight on April 10, 2017 at the Kunlun Fight World Combat Sports Center in Beijing, China.

Results

Kunlun Fight 60

Results

Kunlun Fight MMA 11

Kunlun Fight 61

Results

Kunlun Fight MMA 12

Kunlun Fight 62

Results

Kunlun Fight 63

Results

Kunlun Fight MMA 13

Kunlun Fight 64

Results

Kunlun Fight 65

Results

Kunlun Fight MMA 14

Kunlun Fight MMA 15

Kunlun Fight MMA 16

Kunlun Fight 66

Results

Kunlun Fight 67

Results

Kunlun Fight 68

Results

See also
List of Kunlun Fight events
2017 in Glory
2017 in Glory of Heroes
2017 in Wu Lin Feng

External links

References

2017 in kickboxing
Kickboxing in China
Kunlun Fight events
2017 in Chinese sport